Alexander Mallace Leckie (born 25 March 1938) better known as Sandy Leckie is a British fencer. He competed at the 1960, 1964 and 1968 Summer Olympics.

Biography
Leckie represented Scotland at three editions of the British & Empire Commonwealth Games between 1958 and 1966. Leckie won gold in the individual sabre and silver in the team sabre competition at the 1970 British Commonwealth Games in Edinburgh.  He was the flag bearer for the Scotland Team at the opening ceremony.

Of his three Olympic appearances his best result was reaching the last 16 in 1968 Games in Mexico City.

Leckie was an eight times British fencing champion, winning three foil titles and five sabre titles at the British Fencing Championships, from 1961 to 1968.

In 2014, Leckie was awarded an honorary degree from the University of Glasgow in recognition of his sporting success.

References

1938 births
Living people
British male fencers
Olympic fencers of Great Britain
Fencers at the 1960 Summer Olympics
Fencers at the 1964 Summer Olympics
Fencers at the 1968 Summer Olympics
Sportspeople from Watford
Fencers at the 1962 British Empire and Commonwealth Games
Fencers at the 1966 British Empire and Commonwealth Games
Fencers at the 1970 British Commonwealth Games
Commonwealth Games medallists in fencing
Commonwealth Games gold medallists for Scotland
Commonwealth Games silver medallists for Scotland
Medallists at the 1970 British Commonwealth Games